Clunes is a small town in the Northern Rivers region of New South Wales, Australia. It is located approximately 18 km northeast of Lismore. In , Clunes had a population of 559 people.

Description and history

Situated in hilly country, the volcanic soils provided by nearby Mount Warning allow for macadamia and coffee-growing.

Also nicknamed "The Holy City" because of the number of fine early Australian churches in the village. Clunes has a number of good local services including: a general store and café, petrol station, butcher, bookstore, nurseries and an antiques shop. With many attractive North Coast federation houses in the district, the area is popular with people working in nearby Lismore and Byron Bay. The village is named after Robert Mortimer Clunes, an early engineer in the dairying industry.

Notes

Towns in New South Wales
Northern Rivers
City of Lismore
Byron Shire